The following is a list of the highest-grossing opening weekends for films. The list is dominated by recent films due to inflation, steadily increasing production and marketing budgets, and modern films opening on more screens.

Biggest worldwide openings on record
This list charts films the 50 biggest worldwide openings. Since many films do not open on Fridays in many markets, the 'opening' is taken to be the gross between the first day of release and the first Sunday following the movie's release. Figures prior to the year 2002 are not available. 

Since many American films do not open in all markets at the same time, the 'opening' gross varies depending on when it was released in the US-Canada market. For example, for films like Harry Potter and the Deathly Hallows – Part 2 and Batman v Superman: Dawn of Justice which opened in the US-Canada market and in most other major markets during the same weekend, the 'opening' is the total gross of the film during that weekend. On the other hand, for films like Avengers: Age of Ultron and Captain America: Civil War which opened in several markets a week ahead of their respective releases in the US-Canada market, the 'opening' is the sum of the opening grosses in the markets where they were released first and the opening in the US-Canada market. In the latter case, the opening grosses from territories after the initial overseas opening are not included in the 'opening' of the film. In all cases, if a film opens in a market after its release in the US-Canada market, that opening is not included in the 'opening' of the film.

Individual country records

Biggest openings in China
Since many films do not open on Fridays in many markets (such as China), the 'opening' is taken to be the gross between the first day of release and the first Sunday following the movie's release.

Biggest openings in the United States and Canada

Biggest opening day in the United States 
A list of the biggest opening days of release, including previews from midnight or the previous evening.

Biggest opening day in China

Record holders

Previous opening weekend record holders worldwide
These are the films that, when first released, set the opening three-day weekend record after going into wide release.

Previous opening weekend record holders in the United States and Canada
These are the films that, when first released, set the opening record in the United States and Canada.

See also
List of fastest-grossing films
List of fastest-selling products
List of highest-grossing openings for animated films
List of highest-grossing second weekends for films
Second weekend in box office performance

Notes

References

Openings